Peter Dyneley (13 April 1921 – 19 August 1977) was a British actor. Although he appeared in many smaller roles in both film and television, he is best remembered for supplying the voice of Jeff Tracy for the 1960s "Supermarionation" TV series Thunderbirds and its two film sequels, Thunderbirds Are Go (1966) and Thunderbird 6 (1968), all produced by Gerry Anderson. Uncredited, Dyneley also provided the voice of the countdown that introduces the Thunderbirds title sequence.

Life and career
Born in Hastings, Sussex on 13 April 1921, Peter Dyneley spent his early years in Canada but was educated at Radley College in Oxfordshire, UK. He served in the Royal Canadian Navy during the Second World War. After the war, he attended the Guildhall School of Music and Drama in London, where he studied opera and developed his bass voice. It was at this institution that he made the acquaintance of fellow student Christine May, whom he later married. They had two children, Richard and Amanda.

Having lived in Canada, Dyneley frequently performed with a North American accent. He acted primarily in stage productions prior to 1954, when he turned his attention to film. On stage and in film, he regularly appeared opposite his second wife, the actress Jane Hylton, whom he met on the set of Ett kunglit aventyr (Laughing in the Sunshine), made in 1956. They also co-starred together in The Manster in 1959. He also appeared as a guest star in many television series. He spoke fluent French, German and Spanish. Dyneley died of cancer in London on 19 August 1977, at age 56. His wife Jane died of a heart attack 18 months later, on 28 February 1979.

Thunderbirds voice-over
English actor Brian Cobby claimed he had provided the voice-over for the opening sequence countdown of Thunderbirds in 1964. This was refuted by Thunderbirds producer Gerry Anderson, who confirmed countdown was indeed recorded by Dyneley.

Dyneley's countdown was reused in the first trailer for the series' 2015 reboot Thunderbirds Are Go!, as well as its opening sequence, and also for the launch countdown for the various Thunderbirds in the episodes.

Filmography

Film

Hell Below Zero (1954) as Miller
You Know What Sailors Are (1954) as Lieutenant Andrews
The Young Lovers (1954) as Regan (uncredited)
Beau Brummell (1954) as Midger
Third Party Risk (1954) as Tony Roscoe
The Stolen Airliner (1955) as Uncle George
 Laughing in the Sunshine (1956) as Greg Preston
The Battle of the River Plate (1956) as Captain, Newton Beach, Prisoner on Graf Spee (uncredited)
The Golden Disc (1958) as Mr Washington
The Strange Awakening (1958) as Dr Rene Normand
The Whole Truth (1958) as Willy Reichel
Deadly Record (1959) as Dr. Morrow
The Manster (1959) as Larry Stanford
Sink the Bismarck! (1960) as Commander Jenkins (uncredited)
October Moth (1960) as Tom
House of Mystery (1961) as Mark Lemming
The Roman Spring of Mrs. Stone (1961) as Lloyd Greener
The Day of the Triffids (1962) Narrator, Parisian Radio Operator (voice, uncredited)
Call Me Bwana (1963) as Williams
Thunderbirds Are Go (1966) as Jeff Tracy (voice)
Thunderbird 6 (1968) as Jeff Tracy (voice)
The Executioner (1970) as Balkov
Chato's Land (1972) as Ezra Meade
Royal Sovereign Light (1972) Documentary Narrator
Death of a Snowman (1976) as Captain

Television

Fabian of the Yard (1954, 1 episode) as Captain Pool
Colonel March of Scotland Yard (1954) (1 episode) as Red
The Vise (1955, 1 episode)
Portrait of Alison (1955, 5 episodes) as Henry Carmichael
Douglas Fairbanks, Jr., Presents (1955, 2 episodes) as Bill Stevens/Mitch
London Playhouse (1955, 1 episode) as John Bell
The Adventures of Aggie (1956,1 episode) as Mike
Sailor of Fortune (1956, 1 episode) as Darren
The New Adventures of Charlie Chan (1957, 2 episodes) as Dr Paul Liggat/John Robey
The Adventures of a Jungle Boy (1957, 1 episode) as Harold Gayland
Assignment Foreign Legion (1957, 1 episode) as Richard Harding
ITV Playhouse (1957, 1 episode) as Arthur Hayes
Ivanhoe (1958, 1 episode) as Baron Mauray
African Patrol (1958–1959, 3 episodes) as Landray/Robert Gibson
Armchair Theatre (1958–1959, 4 episodes) as Lew Myrick
The Flying Doctor (1959, 1 episode) as Jeff Ferguson
Dial 999 (1959, 1 episode) as Harry Killian
The Four Just Men (1959–1960, 2 episodes) as Dougan/Police Chief
Interpol Calling (1960, 1 episode) as LeRoy
Golden Girl (1960) as Joe Francis
Alcoa Presents: One Step Beyond (1961, 1 episode) as Hadley
International Detective (1961, 1 episode) as Len Rickman
Drama 61-67 (1961–1964, 1 episode) as Frank Ellinger
Ghost Squad (1961–1963, 2 episodes) as Arnell/Phil Slade
ITV Play of the Week (1961–1964, 3 episodes) as Major Ritter/Pyotr Kirpichov/Sir Basil Fleming
Out of This World (1962, 1 episode) as Inspector Slinn
Man of the World (1962, 1 episode) as Tony Gardner
Z-Cars (1962, 1 episode) as Jackey Simmons
No Hiding Place (1962–1965, 2 episodes) as Cliff Davidson/Mr Brome
The Saint (1962–1967, 3 episodes) as Nat Grindel/Paul Verrier/Richard Eade
Sunday-Night Play (1963, 1 episode) as Mr Wright
Maigret (1963, 1 episode) as Clark
Espionage (1963, 1 episode) as Parrott
Sergeant Cork (1964, 1 episode) as Field Marshal
Catch Hand (1964, 1 episode) as Mr Niel
Crane (1965, 1 episode) as Peter Garvey
Thunderbirds (1965–1966, 32 episodes) as Jeff Tracy (voice)
Kraft Mystery Theatre (2 episodes) as Dr Morrow/Mark Lemming
Theatre 625 (1 episode) as Grantley Lewis
Hereward the Wake (1965)
The Mask of Janus (1965, 1 episode) as Commander Charles Hastings
The Spies (1966, 1 episode) as Charles Hastings
Graf Yoster (1970, 1 episode) as Lord Alistair Abdington
Thriller (1974, 1 episode) as David Garrick
The Goodies (1974, 1 episode – Clown Virus) as General
The Sweeney (1977, 1 episode) as Tarley

References

External links
 
 

1921 births
1977 deaths
Military personnel from Sussex
20th-century English male actors
Male actors from Sussex
Alumni of the Guildhall School of Music and Drama
Deaths from cancer in England
English basses
English expatriates in Canada
English male film actors
English male stage actors
English male television actors
English male voice actors
Operatic basses
People educated at Radley College
People from Hastings
Royal Canadian Navy personnel of World War II
20th-century British  male opera singers